Wandel may refer to:

Places
Wandel Sea, Arctic Ocean
Wandel Land, Greenland
Wandel Peak, Booth Island, Antarctica
Lamington, South Lanarkshire, Scotland

Other uses
Wandel, an Austrian political party founded in 2012

People with the surname
Bernie Wandel, American musician
Carl Frederik Wandel (1843–1930), Danish polar explorer and hydrographer
Elisabeth Wandel (1850–1926), Danish painter
  (1926–2019), German architect
Joachim Wandel (1914–1942), German pilot
Martin Wandel (1892–1943), German general
Momo Wandel Soumah (died 2003), Guinean singer
Sigurd Wandel (1875–1947), Danish painter